Starr Township is a township in Cloud County, Kansas, USA.  As of the 2000 census, its population was 653.

Geography
According to the USGS, it contains one cemetery, Miltonvale.

References
 USGS Geographic Names Information System (GNIS)

External links
 US-Counties.com
 City-Data.com

Townships in Cloud County, Kansas
Townships in Kansas